Margolius is a surname. Notable people with the surname include:

Ivan Margolius (born 1947), Czech author and architect
Rudolf Margolius (1913–1952), Czechoslovak politician

See also
Margolis